Stormy Weather may refer to:

Films
Stormy Weather (1935 film), a British comedy film directed by Tom Walls
Stormy Weather (1943 film), an American musical motion picture produced and released by 20th Century Fox in 1943
Stormy Weathers (film), a 1992 film directed by Will Mackenzie
Stormy Weather (2003 film), a French-Icelandic film

Television
"Stormy Weather," an episode of Blue's Clues
"Stormy Weather," an episode of Courage the Cowardly Dog
"Stormy Weather," an episode of SpongeBob SquarePants
"Stromy Weather," an episode of Miraculous: Tales of Ladybug & Catnoir

Music

Albums
Stormy Weather (Lena Horne album), 1957
Stormy Weather (Thelonious Monster album), 1990
Stormy Weather (Grace Knight album), 1991
Stormy Weather (AT&T album), a 1998 live compilation album by various artists

Songs
"Stormy Weather" (song), a 1933 song written by Harold Arlen and Ted Koehler and first sung by Ethel Waters at The Cotton Club in Harlem 
"Stormy Weather", a song by the Pixies from their 1990 album Bossanova
"Stormy Weather" (Echo & the Bunnymen song), their 2005 single
"Stormy Weather", a song by Grime MC Wiley, from his 2006 mixtape "Da 2nd Phaze"
"Stormy Weather", a song by Kings of Leon from their 2021 album When You See Yourself
"Stormy Weather", a song by The Kooks from their 2008 album Konk
"Stormy Weather", a song by Nina Nastasia from her 2000 album Dogs

Other uses 
Stormy Weather (yacht), the 1934 yacht that won both the 1935 Fastnet race and Trans-Atlantic races
Stormy Weather (novel), a 1995 novel by Carl Hiaasen
Stormy Weather: The Life of Lena Horne, a 2009 biography of Lena Horne by James Gavin
A cocktail made with rum, ginger beer and lime juice